Matlock is an American television legal drama, starring Andy Griffith, that ran from March 3, 1986, to May 8, 1992, on NBC and from November 5, 1992, to May 4, 1995, on ABC. A total of 9 seasons and 194 episodes were produced.

Series overview

Episodes

Pilot (1986)

Season 1 (1986–87)

The two-part episode "The Don" served as a back-door pilot for Jake and the Fatman.

Season 2 (1987–88)

Season 3 (1988–89)

Season 4 (1989–90)

Season 5 (1990–91)

Season 6 (1991–92)

Season 7 (1992–93)

Season 8 (1993–94)

Season 9 (1994–95)

See also
List of Matlock characters

References

External links
 Complete Episode Guide at tagsrwc.com
 Episodes for "Matlock" at the Internet Movie Database
 www.tv.com

Lists of American comedy-drama television series episodes
Matlock (TV series)